Alchemilla filicaulis is a species of plants belonging to the family Rosaceae.

It is native to Europe and Northern America. It is a known host species to at least two species of pathogenic fungi, Peronospora potentillae and Ramularia aplospora.

References

filicaulis